Lorraine Hunt is an English former international footballer who played as a forward and midfielder for the Doncaster Belles. She represented the England women's national football team at senior international level and spent most of her career with the Belles. Hunt was part of the team at the 1987 European Competition for Women's Football.

Honours
Doncaster Belles: FA Women's Cup: 1987

See also
 List of England women's international footballers (alphabetical)
 1987 European Competition for Women's Football squads

References

Living people
Year of birth missing (living people)
Place of birth missing (living people)
Doncaster Rovers Belles L.F.C. players
England women's international footballers
Women's association football forwards
English women's footballers